Nasutitermes horni, is a species of termite of the genus Nasutitermes. It is found in Sri Lanka. It is not considered as a pest, although they are abundant in coconut plantations and forests.

References

External links
A PRELIMINARY INVENTORY OF SUBTERRANEAN TERMITES IN THE PREMISES OF FACULTY OF SCIENCE, UNIVERSITY OF KELANIYA
Termite Assemblages in Lower Hanthana Forest and Variation in Worker Mandible - Structure with Food Type

Termites
Insects described in 1902
Insects of Sri Lanka